Sitra ( or , As-Sitra), also known as Sitrah or Sitra Island, is an island in Bahrain.

History
Conflict with Al Khalifa in 1782
In 1782, a conflict occurred between locals and a number of Al Khalifa who came from Zubara to buy supplies. The clashes resulted in deaths from both sides.

Arab Spring
During the Arab Spring, there was a big protest here. Many protesters were injured or killed. (See Day of Rage (Bahrain)).

Geography
The Island is located just east of Bahrain Island in Persian Gulf. It lies south of Manama and Nabih Saleh. The island's western coast forms the boundary of Tubli Bay.
The island used to be covered in date palm groves and farms, watered by several freshwater springs. Mangroves used to line the western coast, however they have almost disappeared due to development.

Demography

Most of the inhabitants of the island live in nine historic villages: 
Wadyan
Al Kharijiya
Marquban
Al Garrya
Mahazza
Sufala
Abul Aish
Halat Um al-Baidh (the location of the yacht club and Al Bandar resort)
Al Hamriya

There is a massive land reclamation project called East Sitra which increased the island size by 50% and has a new city built on it.

Economy
The island's economy used to be based on agriculture and fishing. 
The northern section of the island has been turned into an industrial area. Bapco oil storage reservoirs are located in the south. Sitra is also the terminus of the 42-km Dhahran-Sitra natural gas pipeline, which connects it to Dahran in Saudi Arabia.

Several car and furniture showrooms also make up the new development on the island.
The Sitra Club is a cultural and sports club for the island.

Today Sitra handles Bahrain's entire petroleum production. It is the location of Port of Sitra. It is also the export center for the oil fields in northeastern Saudi Arabia.

Education

Sitra is the site of many school campuses such as Al Noor International School and Indian School, Bahrain. The Applied Science University is located here.

Transportation
The Sitra Causeway connects the north of the island to Nabih Saleh and to Umm al Hussam (Manama) on Bahrain Island. 
Two small bridges on the south west of Sitra also joins Bahrain Island, near the villages of Ma'ameer and Eker.

Administration
The southern part of the island belongs to Southern Governorate and the northern part to Capital Governorate.
Between 1990 and 2013 it was part of Central Governorate of Bahrain, but that is now dissolved.
Between 1920 and 1990 it was part of Sitra Municipality.

Sitra Municipality
This was a municipality in Bahrain before they were re-organized as Governorates. The Sitra Municipality consisted of the island of Sitra and three villages close to it on the main island of Bahrain: Ma'ameer, Eker and Nuwaidrat.

Image gallery

Sitra Island

References

External links

 
Populated places in Bahrain
Islands of Bahrain
Artificial islands of Bahrain
Former municipalities (regions) of Bahrain
Islands of the Persian Gulf